A chiffon cake is a very light cake made with vegetable oil, eggs, sugar, flour, baking powder, and flavorings. Being made with vegetable oil, instead of a traditional solid fat such as butter or shortening, it is easier to beat air into the batter. As a result, chiffon cakes (as well as angel cakes and other foam cakes) achieve a fluffy texture by having egg whites beaten separately until stiff and then folded into the cake batter before baking. Its aeration properties rely on both the quality of the meringue and the chemical leaveners.

A chiffon cake combines methods used with sponge cakes and conventional cakes. It includes baking powder and vegetable oil, but the eggs are separated and the whites are beaten before being folded into the batter, creating the rich flavor like an oil cake, but with a lighter texture that is more like a sponge cake. 

They can be baked in tube pans or layered with fillings and frostings. 

In the original recipe, the cake tin is not lined or greased, which enables the cake batter to stick to side of the pan, giving the cake better leverage to rise, as well as support in the cooling process when the cake is turned upside down to keep air bubbles stable.

Characteristics
The high oil and egg content create a very moist cake, and as oil is liquid even at cooler temperatures, chiffon cakes do not tend to harden or dry out as traditional butter cakes might. This makes them better-suited than many cakes to filling or frosting with ingredients that need to be refrigerated or frozen, such as pastry cream or ice cream. The lack of butter, however, means that chiffon cakes lack much of the rich flavor of butter cakes.

History
The recipe is credited to Harry Baker (1883–1974), a Californian insurance salesman turned caterer. Baker kept the recipe secret for 20 years until he sold it to General Mills, which spread the recipe through marketing materials in the 1940s and 1950s under the name "chiffon cake", and a set of 14 recipes and variations was released to the public in a Betty Crocker pamphlet published in 1948.

In popular culture 
 In the United States, March 29 is National Lemon Chiffon Cake Day.

See also
Japanese cheesecake
Paper wrapped cake
 List of lemon dishes and beverages

References

External links
 

Cakes